District 29 of the Oregon State Senate comprises all of Gilliam, Morrow, Sherman, Umatilla, Union, and Wallowa counties, as well as parts of Wasco County. It is currently represented by Republican Bill Hansell of Pendleton.

Election results
District boundaries have changed over time, therefore, senators before 2013 may not represent the same constituency as today. From 1993 until 2003 and from 2003 until 2013 it covered a slightly different area in northeastern Oregon.

References

29
Gilliam County, Oregon
Morrow County, Oregon
Sherman County, Oregon
Umatilla County, Oregon
Union County, Oregon
Wallowa County, Oregon
Wasco County, Oregon